White tail or whitetail may refer to:

Places
 Whitetail, Montana
 Whitetail Ski Resort

Animals

Mammals
 White-tailed deer
 White-tailed jackrabbit

Fish
 Centropyge flavicauda or whitetail angelfish, an angelfish from the Indo-pacific Ocean
 Whitetail dascyllus or white-tailed damselfish, a common aquarium fish
 Whitetail dogfish, a sleeper shark from the Indian Ocean
 Sufflamen albicaudatum or whitetail trigger, a triggerfish from the Indian Ocean

Birds
 White-tailed eagle
 White-tailed kite

Other animals
 Bothrops leucurus or whitetail lancehead, a Brazilian pit viper
 Two North American dragonflies in the genus Ladona: 
Common whitetail
Desert whitetail
 White-tailed spider

Other uses
 An aerospace manufacturing term for an aircraft or rocket that has been built but not yet sold.

Animal common name disambiguation pages